The United States Army Security Assistance Command (USASAC) – the 'Army's Face to the World' - implements security assistance programs, including Foreign Military Sales (FMS) of defense articles and services to eligible foreign governments. In addition, USASAC is responsible for the US Army's security assistance information management and financial policy and provides logistics guidance to the army's security assistance community. The command also supports the U.S. government's emergency assistance, humanitarian relief, and Operations Other Than War, including peacekeeping operations by the United Nations. The USASAC traces its origins to the Army's technical service era, and was designated a major subordinate command (MSC) of the U.S. Army Materiel Command (AMC) in 1975. Since its formation, USASAC has supported major US military operations and supported international peacekeeping and humanitarian efforts. The USASAC's motto is "Strength in Cooperation."

Security assistance is a notionally administered by the United States Department of State. In conjunction with the White House, United States Congress, and the United States Department of the Treasury, military security assistance programs are executed by the United States Department of Defense (DOD). Security assistance "promotes regional stability, deters aggression, maintains alliances, and disseminates democratic values between the United States and its allies."

In carrying out the Army security assistance mission, USASAC calls on all AMC Life Cycle Management Commands, as well as other Department of Defense agencies and U.S. industry for support. USASAC is responsible for life cycle management of FMS cases, from development to execution, financial management, accounting, and settlement. Each sale of equipment to overseas customers comprises the same "total package" of quality material, spare parts, training, publications, technical documentation, maintenance support, and other services that AMC provides to U.S. Army units.

The USASAC was engaged in the "train and equip" mission in both Iraq and Afghanistan as well as provided support to 21 coalition partners. It was anticipated that sales in 2008 would exceed $15 billion. USASAC helped provide Iraq with weapons and ammunition, including Hellfire missiles, after it requested them in order to respond to increased domestic violence. USASAC is also responsible for life cycle management of FMS cases. Each sale to overseas customers comprises the same "total package" of quality material, spare parts, training, publications, technical documentation, maintenance support, and other services that United States Army Materiel Command (AMC) provides to United States Army units. USASAC manages about 4,600 FMS cases valued at more than $134 billion.

In 2022, Poland's purchase of 250 M1A2 SEPv3 Abrams tanks was facilitated by Security Assistance Command. Delivery begins in early 2025.

History
Security assistance is a major component of U.S. foreign policy. Prior to the reorganization of the Army in 1962, which included the formation of the U.S. Army Materiel Command (AMC), the predominant Army technical service involved in the U.S. Foreign Aid Program was the Ordnance Corps' Mutual Security Division, which had program responsibility for foreign aid programs for the Corps. In 1962, the foreign aid functions of the Army technical services were placed into a central organization, creating the Mutual Security Agency (MSA).
AMC's role in security assistance crystallized in February 1965 when the Logistic Control Office of the Supply and Maintenance Command (SMC) was assigned from the U.S. Army Terminal Command, Atlantic, to New Cumberland Army Depot, Pennsylvania. That same year, the Mutual Security Directorate of the SMC Logistic Control Office, New York, was transferred to New Cumberland, and on 1 August 1965, the U.S. Army SMC International Logistics Center (ILC) was established as a separate activity at New Cumberland.

In 1966, the growing ILC was re-designated the U.S. Army International Logistics Center, and the SMC was discontinued and its functions were assumed by AMC. Supporting allies in Vietnam, the ILC continued to expand, as elements of the MSA were transferred to New Cumberland, and Mutual Security Field Offices for Europe, the Far East, and the Southern Command were transferred to administrative control of the ILC.

Army security assistance was elevated to Major Subordinate Command status on 1 November 1975 when the U.S. Army International Logistics Command (USAILCOM) was formed at Headquarters, U.S. Army Materiel Development and Readiness Command (DARCOM, formerly AMC, re-designated AMC in 1984), Alexandria, Virginia. An expanded USAILCOM was reorganized in 1977 and re-designated the U.S. Army Security Assistance Center (USASAC), reflecting its mission (delegated by the CG DARCOM) as the Department of the Army Executive Agent for Security Assistance materiel programs.

USASAC gained 200 employees in 1979 when the Office of the Project Manager, Saudi Arabia National Guard Modernization was assigned to USASAC. The army's security assistance mission was further consolidated in August 1985 when USASAC and Headquarters AMC developed and implemented the Army Centralized Case Management System, under which USASAC was designated the US Army as the single point of contact for managing Foreign Military Sales (FMS). On 1 April 1990, USASAC was re-designated as the U.S. Army Security Assistance Command to reflect its expanded responsibilities.

Within a year, USASAC's performance in Operations Desert Shield and Desert Storm became the stuff of legend. In addition to supporting foreign customers and coalition forces, USASAC employees supported U.S. forces' management of Saudi Arabia's helicopter assets and parts, plus the equipping of Kuwaiti civilians with combat uniforms as they accompanied U.S. in-theater combat forces. Operations personnel were on-call 24 hours a day, seven days a week, and requirements turnaround times for secondary items was reduced from previous years and months to mere days. Overall, new FMS in fiscal year 1991 hit an all-time high of $10.1 billion.

The 1995 Khobar Towers bombing terrorist bombing in Saudi Arabia killed seven and injured dozens of USASAC employees.

On 1 October 2001, USASAC relocated its headquarters to Fort Belvoir, Virginia, completing a planned move onto government-owned property.  Due to the 2005 Base Realignment and Closure Commission report, both Army Materiel Command and USASAC headquarters were relocated to Redstone Arsenal in Huntsville, Alabama.

The USASAC has served 140 allies and friendly countries and multinational organizations, with support by AMC, other DOD agencies, and in partnership with U.S. industry, USASAC provides materiel, training, education and, other services to help our allies strengthen their defensive capabilities, deter aggression, achieve regional stability, and promote democratic values.

Past Commanders

References

External links 
USASAC Homepage

Security Assistance Command